Freestyle skiing at the 2017 Winter Universiade was held at the Shymbulak Ski Resort in Almaty from 30 January to 7 February 2017.

Men's events

Women's events

Mixed events

Medal table

References

External links
Freestyle skiing results at the 2017 Winter Universiade.

Freestyle skiing
Winter Universiade
2017